Alibali is a surname. Notable people with the surname include:

 Ferial Alibali (1933–2011), Albanian actress
 Martha W. Alibali, American psychologist